Quasimitra roselineae is a species of sea snail, a marine gastropod mollusk, in the family Mitridae, the miters or miter snails.

Description
The length of the shell attains 34.9 mm.

Distribution
This species occurs in the Indian Ocean of Somalia.

References

 Martin J.C. & Salisbury R. (2013) A new deep water miter (Gastropoda: Mitridae) from the Indian Ocean. Novapex 14(3): 77-79

External links
 Fedosov A., Puillandre N., Herrmann M., Kantor Yu., Oliverio M., Dgebuadze P., Modica M.V. & Bouchet P. (2018). The collapse of Mitra: molecular systematics and morphology of the Mitridae (Gastropoda: Neogastropoda). Zoological Journal of the Linnean Society. 183(2): 253-337

roselineae
Gastropods described in 2013